Aiguillon is a commune of the Lot-et-Garonne department in southwestern France. It lies near the confluence of the rivers Lot and Garonne. Aiguillon station has rail connections to Agen, Langon and Bordeaux.

The organist and composer Marc de Ranse (1881–1951) was born in Aiguillon.

History
Attached to the English crown in 1318, it was conquered by Du Guesclin in 1370. The future Jean II conducted a large-scale but unsuccessful siege of the place in 1346.
In 1599 it was converted into a duchy of its own.

Population

See also
Communes of the Lot-et-Garonne department
Duke of Aiguillon

References

Communes of Lot-et-Garonne
Agenais